Nigel MacRae Stein (born 15 October 1955) is a British businessman. He is the chief executive (CEO) of GKN, a British multinational automotive and aerospace components company.

Early life
Stein has a bachelor's degree in Engineering Science from the University of Edinburgh.

Career
He has been CEO of GKN since 1 January 2012. He was also president of the Society of Motor Manufacturers and Traders from 2011–2012, and a non-executive director of Wolseley plc.

References

1955 births
Living people
British chief executives
British corporate directors
British automotive engineers
Alumni of the University of Edinburgh